Ferenc Kolláth (6 October 1914 – 11 December 1986) was a Hungarian footballer. He played in five matches for the Hungary national football team from 1939 to 1942. He was also part of Hungary's squad for the football tournament at the 1936 Summer Olympics, but he did not play in any matches.

References

External links
 

1914 births
1986 deaths
Hungarian footballers
Hungary international footballers
People from Szolnok
Association football midfielders
Szolnoki MÁV FC footballers
Hungarian football managers
Sportspeople from Jász-Nagykun-Szolnok County